Market Garden can refer to:

 Market gardening
 Operation Market Garden